Letter to my brother is the seventh and fourth single of his career and album Independent of Faze in Nigeria released in 2006.  The song is the fifth track on the CD and was performed and written by Faze. It reached top ten of most charts but its greatest history was the fact that it did not only end the Plantashun Boiz beef but has also become of the best diss replies in Nigeria of all times.

Reception and acclaim
The single was well received by critics who would tip letter to my brother over 2Face's See me so diss song. Letter to my brother has also proved to be a beef hit by breaking into charts and remaining a moderately played song in radio station in the year 2008, two years after the release of the album.

Music video
The video shot took place in a house where Faze is seen writing a letter as well cry and worry over the problems between both parties beef at the time.

Song with reference to this track
Carnival- Freestyle featuring Sound Sultan
4 Years- Styl Plus

2006 songs
Faze (musician) songs
Songs written by Faze (musician)
2006 singles